Melanodexia tristis is a species of cluster fly in the family Polleniidae.

Distribution
United States.

References

Polleniidae
Insects described in 1893
Diptera of North America
Taxa named by Samuel Wendell Williston